The Rio Suno antwren (Myrmotherula sunensis) is a species of bird in the family Thamnophilidae. It is found in western Brazil Colombia, Ecuador and Peru. Its natural habitat is subtropical or tropical moist lowland forests.

References

Rio Suno antwren
Birds of the Amazon Basin
Birds of the Colombian Amazon
Birds of the Ecuadorian Amazon
Birds of the Peruvian Amazon
Rio Suno antwren
Taxonomy articles created by Polbot